Terrell Dayne Lewis is an English footballer who plays for Pagham. Lewis plays as a right midfielder or right winger.

Career

Chalfont St Peter
Lewis is a product of Chalfont St Peter's youth and football development scheme making over 150 first team appearances for the club and scoring over 70 goals. He joined the club having impressed manager Danny Edwards.

Chesterfield
In October 2009 he was given a trial at Chesterfield, playing two reserve team friendlies against Sheffield and Nottingham Forest Reserves and signed on a one-year contract until the end of the 2009–10 season and made his league debut in a 5–2 home win against Darlington on 21 November 2009. He was released at the end of the season and returned to play for Chalfont St Peter.

References

External links

Terrell Lewis profile at the Chesterfield website

1988 births
Living people
English footballers
Association football midfielders
Chalfont St Peter A.F.C. players
Chesterfield F.C. players
Pagham F.C. players
English Football League players
Southern Football League players
Black British sportspeople
Footballers from the London Borough of Brent